Josef Lüke (13 March 1899 – 1948) was a German international footballer.

References

1899 births
1948 deaths
Association football forwards
German footballers
Germany international footballers